Thomas Jefferson Slave Apartments was a band from Columbus, Ohio active from 1989 to 2000.

History
The band was formed in 1989 by Ron House, the former frontman of the band Great Plains. The band is named after Thomas Jefferson's slave quarters at Monticello. Soon after their formation, they released several 7"s in the Columbus area. They followed these up with their debut album, Bait and Switch, which they recorded at a cost of $800, and which was released in 1995 on American Recordings. This album was followed by their second album, Straight to Video, in 1997 on Anyway Records. Also in 1997, the band released a compilation album, You Lookin' for Treble, which contained singles the band had released from 1990 to 1992, as well as songs from an EP released during that time. Their third and last studio album, "No Old Guy Lo-Fi Cry", was released in 2000 on Rockathon Records, a label owned by Guided by Voices frontman Robert Pollard. 

While the band ended its initial run in 2000, they would continue to perform live in their native Ohio sporadically throughout the 2000s and 2010s.

Guitarist Bob Petric died in April 2021.

Critical reception
Bait and Switch received a favorable review from Entertainment Weekly'''s Ethan Smith, who wrote that the album was "short on polish, long on charm" and gave it a B+ rating. Greg Kot also reviewed the album favorably, writing that there is "Nothing new here, just a clangorous, nasty good time courtesy of some saw-toothed riffs and a supremely estranged wit." Robert Christgau gave Bait and Switch an A− rating, writing that the first five songs on the album "rush by in a perfect furious tunefest". Another review of this album appeared in Spin, in which Eric Weisbard wrote that "House was right to reground his art, putting the way music flows and falls before singer-songwriterly commentary." He also said that on the album, House begins the process of doing something with noise, but that he does not go far enough. In Billboard, David Sprague wrote that Bait and Switch "retain[s] the relaxed, lo-fi vibe" that was apparent on the band's early singles.

Discography
Studio albumsBait and Switch (American Recordings, 1995)Straight to Video (Anyway, 1997)No Old Guy Lo-Fi Cry (Rockathon, 2000)

Compilation albumsYou Lookin' for Treble?'' (Year Zero/Vinyl Retentive, 1997)

References

Musical groups from Columbus, Ohio
Musical groups established in 1989
Musical groups disestablished in 2000
1989 establishments in Ohio
2000 disestablishments in Ohio
Anyway Records artists